Vendhar Movies is an Indian film production and distribution company based in Chennai.

History
In 2012 The company first started as proprietary by B.Balagurunathan and become partnership with S.Madhan in 2013 August. The company first distributed the film "Vettai" starring Madhavan and Aarya (2012 January) in Tirunelvely&Kanyakumari area (blockbuster) .Next the company distributes "Kalakalappu" starring Mirchi Siva, Vimal, Oviya and Anjali (Blockbuster). The company distributed Aravaan starring Aadhi, in 2012. Next they distributed Saguni starring Karthi , introducing Vishal. The film became a 2013 blockbuster. Following this success, Naan Sigappu Manithan was produced. Thiru directed action film, starring Vishal, also went on to become highly successful at the box office, emerging as one of the Tamil films of 2014. Their following production was Puli Paarvai starring S.Madhan will be released soon. Their next production was Poojai starring Vishal and Shruti Haasan, which released on 22 October 2014, coinciding with the Diwali festival and turned out to be another milestone in his career. Simultaneously, they distributed Ethir Neela, the dubbed Telugu version of Ethir Neechal and Vana Yudha, that of Vanayudham, in Andhra Pradesh.

Vendhar Movies distributed the Karthi starrer film, Saguni in 2012. They also started venturing into small-scale films in the same year by purchasing and distributing Kalakalappu, Onbathula Guru and Kumki. Its first production in 2014, Uyirukku Uyiraga starring Sanjeev, Sharan, Preethi Das, and Nandhana was a commercial failure. They also distributed Aarambam, Veeram, Anjaan which opened to highly positive critical reaction. The studio distributed another film starring Vikram Prabhu, Arima Nambi directed by Anand Sankar.

Filmography

Production
 2013 Thillu Mullu 
 2014 Pulipaarvai
 2015 Paayum Puli

Distribution
 2012 Aravaan
 2012 Raattinam
 2012 Saguni
 2012 Paagan
 2013 Vana Yuddham
 2013 Gouravam
 2013 Kutti Puli
 2013 Ethir Neechal
 2013 Thillu Mullu
 2013 Thalaivaa
 2013 Sutta Kadhai
 2013 Nadodi Mannan (Malayalam)
 2013 Aarambam
 2013 Pandiya Naadu
 2013 Ego
 2014 Pani Vizhum Nilavu
 2014 Naan Sigappu Manithan
 2014 Uyirukku Uyiraga
 2014 Sandiyar
 2014 Poriyaalan
 2014 Poojai
 2014 Pulipaarvai
 2017 Motta Shiva Ketta Shiva

Production

Releases

Distribution

References

External links
 

Film distributors of India
Film production companies based in Chennai
Indian film studios
Entertainment companies established in 2012
2012 establishments in Tamil Nadu
Indian companies established in 2012